Osinachi Kalu Okoro Egbu, known professionally as Sinach, (born 30 March 1972) is a Nigerian singer, songwriter and senior worship leader, serving in this capacity for over 30 years. She is the first singer-songwriter to top the Billboard Christian Songwriter chart for 12 weeks in a row. Her song "Way Maker" received three nominations and won the Song of the Year at the 51st GMA Dove Awards, making her the first Nigerian to win the Award. She also won the BMI song of the year, and in 2021 was recognized by the US Congress while on tour in the United States of America.   

She has released 9 studio albums with several other hit songs, including "I Know Who I Am", "Great Are You Lord", "Rejoice", "He Did It Again", "Precious Jesus", "The Name of Jesus", "This Is My Season", "Awesome God", "For This", "I Stand Amazed", "Simply Devoted" and "Jesus is Alive".

"Way Maker" has also piled up many recognition and awards since it was released in 2015. The visuals for Way Maker is currently the second most watched Nigerian music video on YouTube. In March 2019, it became the third Nigerian video to have garnered 100 million views on YouTube behind Davido's "Fall" and Yemi Alade's Johnny".   "Way Maker" has been covered by over 60 Christian artists such as Michael W. Smith, Darlene Zschech, Leeland, Bethel Music, and Mandisa and in many languages. In the first few weeks of the Coronavirus pandemic and lockdown in 2020, Way Maker was the go to song, as several viral videos in hospitals, parks were made with large numbers of people singing the song. After being on the Christian Copyright Licensing International top 100 chart for several months in 2020, it claimed the No. 1 position in June and has remained till December 2020, making it the most played song in Churches across the United States for 2020.

Sinach received a Bethlehem Hall of Faith certificate of commemoration during her visit to Israel in December 2017. In September 2019, Sinach became the first gospel artist from Africa to tour India, headlining concerts with several thousands in attendance. In May 2020, she became the first African artist to top the Billboard Christian Songwriters chart. In July 2022, she joined the Grammy Recording Academy as a voting member. 

In 2023 February, the government of the Commonwealth of Dominica awarded Sinach as global ambassador, via a letter signed by the Prime Minister, Roosevelt Skerrit.

Biography

Early life 
Sinach hails from Ebonyi State, Eastern Nigeria, and is the second daughter of seven children.

Sinach started singing for family and friends in 1989 as a hobby, while working as a staff and choir member in Christ Embassy, Pastor Chris Oyakhilome's Church. She studied physics and graduated from the University of Port Harcourt, Rivers State, Nigeria. She considered relocating from Nigeria after her University education, but was advised against it by Pastor Chris Oyakhilome.

Personal life 
In 2014, Sinach married Joseph Egbu in her home Church Christ Embassy. On 17 November 2019, at the LIMA Awards Pastor Chris Oyakhilome, announced the arrival of Sinach's first child Rhoda.

Musical career 
As a child, Sinach stated she had dreams, where she saw herself singing to large crowds, but didn't actively pursue anything musically as a career besides joining the choir, and also working as an administrative staff in the Church. Sinach had written many songs before she released her first album, Chapter One in 2008. Her song 'This Is Your Season' won the Song of the Year award in 2008.

Speaking on how she came by her stage name Sinach, she said: "I chose that from my name Osinachi because it is easy to pronounce and catchy".

In 2016, Sinach was the first recipient of the LIMA Songwriter of the Decade Award, recognizing her contribution to gospel music in the previous decade. Her songs were being sung in many countries,
 translated to many languages, around the world. That same year, she received the African Achievers' Award for Global Excellence. Also that same year, for the second time in a row, she won the Western Africa Artist of the Year by Groove Awards in Kenya, and was listed by YNaija alongside Chris Oyakhilome, Enoch Adeboye as one of the Top 100 Influential Christians in Nigeria.

As a songwriter, Sinach has written over 200 songs and won several awards. Her song 'This Is Your Season' won the Song of the Year award in 2008.  One of her most popular songs is 'I Know Who I Am'.

Performance 
Sinach has performed and headlined concerts in over 50 countries including Kenya, Dominica, South Africa, United States, Canada, Antigua & Barbuda, Trinidad and Tobago, Jamaica, Grenada, Uganda, Barbados, The British Virgin Islands, Zambia, Saint Maarten, the United Kingdom and India

Sinach also performed in her home country in experience hosted by the Senior Pastor of the Metropolitan House on the Rock churches, Pastor Paul Adefarasin, also she performed in  annual Women on the Winning Edge Conference hosted by Funke Felix-Adejumo.

In one of recent chats with music journalist Motolani Alake of Pulse Nigeria, Sinach reveals how God arrested her into gospel ministration through Pastor Chris Oyakhilome's anointing.

On December 22, 2020, at the third ceremony of African Entertainment Awards USA, she won the Best Gospel Artist award.

Albums
In February 2021, Sinach announced the release of her 12th Studio album, titled, GREATEST LORD which features several high profiled Gospel artists such as Maranda Curtis, Darlene Zschech, Nathaniel Bassey, Panam Percy Paul, Micah Stampley, Leeland and Jekalyn Carr.

Awards and nominations
 2016 LIMA Songwriter of the Decade Award
 2016 Groove Awards Western Africa Artist of the Year
 2016 African Achievers' Award for Global Excellence 
 Top 100 Influential Christians in Nigeria. 
2019 LIMA Song of the Year
 2020 Sinach Has Been Named Among Africa's Most Influential Women
2020 Dove Awards Song of the year

See also
 List of Igbo people
 List of Nigerian gospel musicians
 List of Nigerian musicians
 List of people from Ebonyi State

References

External links
 
 
 Sinach Full Songs & Album

1972 births
Nigerian songwriters
Nigerian gospel singers
Loveworld Records artists
Musicians from Abia State
Igbo musicians
21st-century Nigerian women singers
Living people
People from Ebonyi State